The 1984–85 Australian region cyclone season was one of the most active seasons on record. It officially started on 1 November 1984, and officially ended on 30 April 1985.



Seasonal summary

Systems

Severe Tropical Cyclone Emma 

A Category 3  cyclone, Emma struck Western Australia on 12 December 1984, as a Category 1  cyclone.

Tropical Storm 04S 

Due to its minimal intensity, 04S was designated only as a tropical storm strength cyclone by the Joint Typhoon Warning Center (JTWC). The storm remained unnamed by the warning center in Darwin.

Severe Tropical Cyclone Frank 

Tropical Cyclone Frank was a significant tropical cyclone which formed off the western coast of Australia. It peaked as a Category 1 storm on the Saffir–Simpson scale according to the JTWC. Perth assessed it as a category 3 on the Australian scale. After it turned to the south-east on 25 December, it made landfall as a Category 2 two days later near Port Hedland, Western Australia.

Tropical Cyclone Monica 

Monica peaked as a category 2 storm, tracking roughly south-eastward, passing into the South Pacific basin on 28 December.

Tropical Cyclone Nigel 

During the middle of January, an ill-defined tropical low formed within the Intertropical Convergence Zone, near the Cape York Peninsula and moved eastwards into the Coral Sea. Over the next few days, the system moved eastwards into the Coral Sea, before its circulation became better defined during 14 January. The system continued to move eastwards over the next couple of days, before the JTWC initiated advisories on the system and designated it as Tropical Cyclone 13P on 16 January. Later that day, as the system approached 160°E and the South Pacific basin, TCWC Brisbane reported that the low had become a tropical cyclone and named it Nigel. Nigel caused no damage while located within the Australian region, however, the system later caused significant impacts to Fiji and Vanuatu.

Severe Tropical Cyclone Odette 

Odette was a powerful cyclone. It lasted for 4 days.

Tropical Cyclone Gertie 

Gertie made landfall in Western Australia before dissipating.

Tropical Low 18P 

This system remained weak.

Severe Tropical Cyclone Hubert 

Hubert had major differences in peak intensity from BOM and JTWC, but did not touch land.

Severe Tropical Cyclone Isobel 

Isobel failed to affect land.

Severe Tropical Cyclone Jacob 

Jacob was a Category 3 system on the Australian scale.

Tropical Cyclone Pierre 

On 17 February the BoM reported that an ill-defined tropical low had developed within the intertropical convergence zone, near the tip of the Cape York Peninsula. The system became more defined over the next few days, as it moved out into the Coral Sea and slowly moved south-eastwards parallel to the Queensland coast. At around the same time, the JTWC initiated advisories and designated the system as Tropical Cyclone 26P, before they reported that Pierre had peaked as a tropical storm with 1-minute sustained winds of  later that day.

The system subsequently accelerated south-eastwards, before the BoM reported that Pierre had peaked as a Category 2 tropical cyclone with 10-minute sustained winds of  during 21 February. Later that day, the system made landfall in Shoalwater Bay and weakened below tropical cyclone intensity, before it moved back into the Coral Sea near Yeppoon. Pierre subsequently moved almost due eastwards, before it was last noted during 24 February as it moved out of the Australian region and into the South Pacific basin. As Pierre moved south-eastwards parallel to the Queensland coast, it produced high seas, gale-force winds, minor flooding and minimal damage.

Tropical Cyclone Rebecca

During the middle of February, a cloud mass persisted for several days in the Arafura sea, to the north of the Arnhem Land in northern Australia. During that day the system gradually intensified as it moved north-eastwards, before it gradually started to move south-eastwards and entered the Gulf of Carpentaria. During 21 February, the low continued to move south-eastwards and gradually intensify as it moved south-eastwards through the Gulf of Carpentaria, before TCWC Brisbane reported that it had become a tropical cyclone and named it Rebecca.

The initial tropical low produced a moderate amount of rainfall over the Arnhem Land, with a 24-hour rainfall total of  reported at Warruwi on 19 February. There was no significant damage associated with Rebecca in the Northern Territory, while some damage to trees was reported in Weipa.

Tropical Cyclone Kirsty 

Although powerful, Kirsty failed to make landfall.

Severe Tropical Cyclone Lindsay 

Cyclone Lindsay formed on 6 March 1985. The storm moved south-southeast reaching Category 3  status before making landfall near Broome, Western Australia.

Severe Tropical Cyclone Sandy 

Sandy formed on 19 March in the Gulf of Carpentaria and strengthened rapidly into a Category 4 cyclone, before it made landfall near Sir Edward Pellew Group of Islands as a Category 2 cyclone on 24 March. Over the next days, Sandy moved into the Indian Ocean and dissipated on 3 April.

Similar to Cyclone Kathy, the storm was not as intense as Kathy. Flooding was extensive along the southern gulf coast.

Tropical Cyclone Tanya 

Over the next couple of days, the system moved westwards and gradually developed further, before the JTWC initiated advisories on the low and designated it as Tropical Cyclone 32P during 29 March. The BoM subsequently reported that the system had developed into a tropical cyclone and named it Tanya, as it continued to develop further and moved westwards towards the Cape York Peninsula.

Tanya maintained its peak intensity for around 24 hours, before it started to weaken as it approached Cape York during 31 March. The system subsequently made landfall near Coen on the Cape York Peninsula, at around 14:00 AEST (0400 UTC) on 1 April and rapidly weakened below tropical cyclone intensity. Tanya's remnant tropical low was last noted by the BoM later that day as it moved towards the centre of Cape York. However, over the next couple of days, the JTWC continued to monitor Tanya's remnants as they moved across the Gulf of Carpentaria, before they made landfall and dissipated over the Arnhem Land during 4 April. Tanya caused some minor damage to vegetation, while there were no deaths or structural damage reported.

Severe Tropical Cyclone Margot 

Cyclone Margot was a tropical cyclone that stayed out to sea during its entire duration. It was first identified on 10 April, off the coast of Sunda Strait. Margot then traveled to the southwest during 12 April, gradually intensifying to a tropical cyclone. In the noon hours of 13 April, it began to move to the southeast, under the influence of an intense high-pressure area to the south. This intensity was based on satellite estimates, but the strongest report was from a ship eighteen hours earlier. After peak intensity Margot gradually weakened up until the 19, when it briefly underwent intensification, and turned west. This was short lived however, as dry, easterly low-level winds and wind shear began to influence the cyclone. Margot began to rapidly weaken and move in an easterly direction on 20 April. On the 21 Margot had become a remnant low after completing a figure-eight path. On the 25 the remnant low was absorbed by a broad low-pressure system located in the northeast Indian Ocean.

Tropical Cyclone Gretel 

On 9 April, the BoM started to monitor a weak tropical low that had developed within the Gulf of Papua, to the west of Port Moresby in Papua New Guinea. Over the next couple of days, the system moved south-westwards through the Torres Strait and over the southern Arafura Sea, however, it remained poorly organised, which made it hard for the BoM to track the system and assess its intensity. During the following day, TCWC Darwin reported that the system had become a tropical cyclone and named the system Gretel, after they had received various reports of gale-force winds from ships.

The newly named system subsequently passed over the Cobourg Peninsula into the Van Diemen Gulf, where it started to moved south-westwards and passed just to the north-west of Darwin at about 06:50 ACST on 13 April (21:20 UTC, 12 April). Over the next couple of days, Gretel moved south-westwards parallel to the coastline of the Northern Territory, as upper-level windshear caused the systems low-level circulation centre to become displaced from the surrounding atmospheric convection. During 14 April the system weakened into a tropical low, while it was located near Port Keats, before it dissipated over the Northern Territory.

Overall Gretel had a minimal impact on Darwin and the Northern Territory, with damages estimated at AU$3 million, while no deaths were reported. The majority of the damage was caused by gale force winds uprooting hundreds of trees, which fell onto roads and power lines and caused power outages across the territory.

The system produced significant rainfall over the Northern Territory, with a rainfall total of  recorded at the Nabarlek Uranium Mine.

Gretel produced significant rainfall over the Top End, with rainfall totals of  recorded over the territory.

A large number of trees were brought down in Darwin, which fell onto power lines and caused power outages across the territory. It was later reported by the NT News that 95% of Darwin's overhead power connections were brought down by Gretel.

Season effects 
This table lists all the storms that developed in the Australian Region during the 1984–85 season. It includes their intensity on the Australian Tropical cyclone intensity scale, duration, name, areas affected, deaths, and damages.

|-
|  ||  || bgcolor=#| || bgcolor=#| || bgcolor=#| || New Caledonia ||  ||  ||
|-
|  ||  || bgcolor=#| || bgcolor=#| || bgcolor=#| || || || ||
|-
| Nigel ||  || bgcolor=#| ||  ||  || Queensland ||  ||  ||
|-
|  ||  || bgcolor=#| || bgcolor=#| || bgcolor=#| || Vanuatu || Minor ||  ||
|-
|  ||  || bgcolor=#| || bgcolor=#| || bgcolor=#| || || || ||
|-
| Pierre ||  || bgcolor=#| || bgcolor=#| || bgcolor=#| || Queensland || Minimal ||  ||
|-
| Rebecca ||  || bgcolor=#| || bgcolor=#| || bgcolor=#| || Arnhem Land, Cape York Peninsula ||  ||  ||
|-
| Sandy ||  || bgcolor=#| || bgcolor=#| || bgcolor=#| || Northern Territory, Western Australia || ||  ||
|-
| Tanya ||  || bgcolor=#| || bgcolor=#| || bgcolor=#| || Cape York Peninsula || Minimal ||  ||
|-
| Margot ||  || bgcolor=#| || bgcolor=#| || bgcolor=#| || Western Australia || ||  ||
|-
| Gretel ||  || bgcolor=#| || bgcolor=#| || bgcolor=#| || Northern Territory || ||  ||
|-

See also 
 Atlantic tropical cyclone seasons: 1984, 1985,
 Eastern Pacific tropical cyclone seasons: 1984, 1985
 Western Pacific typhoon seasons: 1984, 1985
 North Indian Ocean cyclone seasons: 1984, 1985

References 

 
Australian region cyclone seasons
Tropical cyclones in 1984
Tropical cyclones in 1985